Horisont is an Estonian magazine published in Tallinn, Estonia by Loodusajakiri MTÜ. The magazine focuses on science topics and is written in a popular scientific style. It includes interviews with scientists.

From 1967 to 1990 it was published by EKP KK Kirjastus, from 1991 to 2001 by Perioodika, and thereafter by Loodusajakiri MTÜ.

References

External links
 

Magazines published in Estonia
Popular science magazines
1967 establishments in Estonia
Magazines established in 1967